Dora Nginza Hospital is a large Provincial government funded hospital, situated on Spondo Street in Zwide township of Gqeberha in South Africa. It is a tertiary teaching hospital and forms part of the Port Elizabeth Hospital Complex.

The hospital departments include Emergency department, Neonatal and Paediatric wards, Maternity ward, Obstetrics/Gynecology, Psychiatry [ 35 bed Acute Mental Health Unit], Outpatient Adult and Child Psychiatry Clinics, Out Patients Department, Surgical Services, Medical Services, Operating Theatre & CSSD Services, Pharmacy, Anti-Retroviral (ARV) treatment for HIV/AIDS, Post Trauma Counseling Services, Occupational Services, X-ray Services, Occupational Therapy, Speech Therapy, Physiotherapy, NHLS Laboratory, Oral Health Care Provides, Laundry Services, Kitchen Services and Mortuary, Dietitians, Lactation Consultation, The only functional Burn Unit (Paediatric and Adult) in the Eastern Cape.

References
Dora Nginza Hospital

Hospitals in the Eastern Cape
Nelson Mandela Bay Metropolitan Municipality